Modole is a North Halmahera language of Indonesia. The language is spoken in several villages in the Kao region on the northern peninsula of the island of Halmahera.

References

Languages of Indonesia

North Halmahera languages